William Spencer (c. 1552 – 18 December 1609), of Yarnton, Oxfordshire, was an English politician.

He was a Member (MP) of the Parliament of England for Ripon in 1584 and 1586.

References

1550s births
1609 deaths
People from Oxfordshire
English MPs 1584–1585
English MPs 1586–1587